The County of Musgrave is a cadastral unit in the Australian state of South Australia that covers land on the west coast of Eyre Peninsula.  It was proclaimed on 22 June 1876 and named after Anthony Musgrave, the Governor of South Australia from  9 June 1876 to 29 January 1877.

Description 

The town of Elliston falls within the county's borders, and the towns of Lock, Tooligie and Yeelanna are located adjacent to the county's eastern boundary.  

The Flinders Highway passes along the coastline of the county from the northwest to the southeast, the Tod Highway passes through the county in a north–south alignment near its eastern boundary, and the Birdseye Highway passes through the county in a west–east direction between Elliston and Lock.

The Port Lincoln to Wudinna line of the Eyre Peninsula Railway passes through the county near its eastern boundary in a north–south alignment with a branch line terminating at Kapinne in the county's south, and with stations at Lock and Yeelanna.

Constituent hundreds
The county comprises 20 hundreds. The hundreds are laid out from west to east in four rows (from north to south) as follows:
Colton, Talia, Tinline, Squire, McIntosh and Ulyerra.
Ward, Hudd, Kappawanta, Blesing and a cluster consisting of Barwell, McLachan and Cowan.
Way, Pearce, Haig and Peachna.
Kiana, Mitchell and Shannon.

Hundred of Barwell
The Hundred of Barwell was proclaimed on 4 December 1919.

Hundred of Blesing
The Hundred of Blesing was proclaimed on 30 January 1936.

Hundred of Colton

Hundred of Cowan
The Hundred of Cowan was proclaimed on 4 July 1929.

Hundred of Haig
The Hundred of Haig was proclaimed on 9 July 1885 as the Hundred of Homburg which was named after Robert Homburg, a member of the South Australian Parliament. In 1916, the hundred was renamed as part of the policy to change "names of enemy origin". The name Poondulta was proposed but did not proceed. The hundred was finally renamed as the Hundred of Haig after the British soldier, Douglas Haig, 1st Earl Haig.

Hundred of Hudd
The Hundred of Hudd was proclaimed on 31 January 1936.

Hundred of Kappawanta
The Hundred of Kappawanta was proclaimed on 31 January 1936.

Hundred of Kiana
The Hundred of Kiana was proclaimed on 18 September 1879.

Hundred of McIntosh
The Hundred of McIntosh was proclaimed on 20/ December 1934.

Hundred of McLachan
The Hundred of McLachan was proclaimed on 25 April 1895.

Hundred of Mitchell
The Hundred of Mitchell was proclaimed on 26 November 1903.

Hundred of Peachna
The Hundred of Peachna was proclaimed on 3 August 1916.

Hundred of Pearce
The Hundred of Pearce was proclaimed on 4 December 1884.

Hundred of Shannon
The Hundred of Shannon was proclaimed on 15 January 1903.

Hundred of Squire 
The Hundred of Squire was proclaimed on 8 March 1894.

Hundred of Talia 
The Hundred of Talia was proclaimed on 22 September 1881.

Hundred of Tinline
The Hundred of Tinline was proclaimed on 22 September 1881.

Hundred of Ulyerra
The Hundred of Ulyerra was proclaimed on 24 September 1925.

Hundred of Ward 
The Hundred of Ward was proclaimed on 22 June 1876.

Hundred of Way
The Hundred of Way was proclaimed on 22 June 1876.

See also
Lands administrative divisions of South Australia
List of Australian place names changed from German names

References

Musgrave
Musgrave